The Victor Bodson Bridge is a cable-stayed bridge in Hesperange, in southern Luxembourg.  It circles the south-eastern suburbs of Luxembourg City, and carries the A1 motorway between Howald and Itzig, over the Alzette valley below.

The bridge was completed in 1993, as part of the extension of the A1 from Senningerberg (serving Luxembourg Airport) to the south of Luxembourg City.

Because the valley under the bridge is inhabited, the design was limited to a single support pillar, located exactly in the middle of the bridge.  The bridge is stayed by a single suspension mast, located above the support pillar and from which radial cables fan out along the length of the bridge.  Despite its reliance on a single mast for suspension, the bridge is notable for being curved along its entire length.

The bridge is named after Victor Bodson, a government minister in the 1940s and 1950s that held responsibility for Public Works, Transport, and Justice. He was also a recipient of the Righteous Among the Nations award for his participation during the Holocaust in helping Jews escape persecution.

Footnotes

External links

  Page on the official Administration des Ponts et Chassées website

Buildings and structures in Hesperange
Cable-stayed bridges in Luxembourg
Bridges completed in 1993
1993 in Luxembourg